Chandrika Roy is an Indian politician from Saran district of Bihar, India. He was a Member of Bihar Legislative Assembly (2015-2020) representing Parsa (Vidhan Sabha constituency) from RJD Party. Now he is in the Janata Dal (United) Party.

Political career 
Roy made entry into politics in 1985 as member of Bihar Legislative Assembly from Parsa (Vidhan Sabha constituency). Again in 1990, 1995 and 2000, he won from the same constituency. In October 2005 and 2010 Bihar Legislative Assembly elections, he lost to Chhotelal Rai. He also held the position as Minister of Transport Department of Government of Bihar from 2015 to 2017. Currently, he is serving as Member of Bihar Legislative Assembly from Parsa (Vidhan Sabha constituency) since 2015.

He quit the Rashtriya Janata Dal due to the marital dispute between his daughter and RJD president Lalu Prasad Yadav's son Tej Pratap Yadav.

Personal life

Chandrika Roy is the second son of the five sons of Daroga Prasad Rai. Chandrika Rai's daughter Aishwarya Ray married Tej Pratap Yadav, the eldest son of Lalu Prasad Yadav on 12 May 2018.

References 

Bihar MLAs 1985–1990
Bihar MLAs 1990–1995
Bihar MLAs 1995–2000
Bihar MLAs 2000–2005
Bihar MLAs 2015–2020
1957 births
Living people
Rashtriya Janata Dal politicians
Janata Dal politicians
Janata Dal (United) politicians
People from Saran district